is the 48th single by the J-pop group Morning Musume, released in Japan on January 25, 2012 on the Zetima label.

Members 
It is the first single to feature 10th generation members (Haruna Iikubo, Ayumi Ishida, Masaki Sato and Haruka Kudo). It is also the first single since Takahashi Ai's graduation from the group, and the first single with Risa Niigaki as leader.

The single was originally supposed to be released on December 21, 2011, but was delayed to January 25, 2012.

 5th generation: Risa Niigaki
 6th generation: Sayumi Michishige, Reina Tanaka
 8th generation: Aika Mitsui
 9th generation: Mizuki Fukumura, Erina Ikuta, Riho Sayashi, Kanon Suzuki
 10th generation : Haruna Iikubo, Ayumi Ishida, Masaki Sato, Haruka Kudo

Pyoco Pyoco Ultra Vocalists

Main Voc: Risa Niigaki, Reina Tanaka

Center Voc: Sayumi Michishige, Mizuki Fukumura, Riho Sayashi

Minor Voc: Aika Mitsui, Erina Ikuta, Kanon Suzuki, Haruna Iikubo, Ayumi Ishida, Masaki Sato, Haruka Kudo 

Kanashiki Koi no Melody Vocalists

Main Voc: Reina Tanaka

Center Voc: Risa Niigaki, Sayumi Michishige, Riho Sayashi

Minor Voc: Aika Mitsui, Mizuki Fukumura, Erina Ikuta, Kanon Suzuki, Haruna Iikubo, Ayumi Ishida, Masaki Sato, Haruka Kudo

Tie-ups 
"Pyoco Pyoco Ultra" is the opening song for the Nippon Television series Sūgaku Joshi Gakuen, starring many Hello! Project members (the closing theme being "Hatsukoi Cider" by Buono!).

Release information 
The single was released in four versions: a regular CD-only edition (catalog number EPCE-5842) and three limited editions, containing a bonus DVD.

As usual for Hello! Project CD singles, there also was a Single V (a DVD single, containing a music video for the title song) published. It appeared a week later, on February 1, 2012.

CD single

Track listing 
All songs written and composed by Tsunku.
"Pyoco Pyoco Ultra" arranged by Shōichirō Hirata.
"Kanashiki Koi no Melody" arranged by Kaoru Ōkubo.

Bonus 
Sealed both into the Limited Edition and into the first press of the Regular Edition
 Event ticket lottery card with a serial number

Single V

Track listing

Event V

Track listing

Charts

References

External links 
 Review: Pyoco Pyoco Ultra / Morning Musume - Hotexpress

2012 singles
Japanese-language songs
Morning Musume songs
Songs written by Tsunku
Song recordings produced by Tsunku
Zetima Records singles
Japanese television drama theme songs
2012 songs
Japanese synth-pop songs
Songs about birds